Jinggu is a town in Jinggu Dai and Yi Autonomous County, Yunnan, China. It is known as "Home of Tea".

Administrative division
As of 2016, the town is divided into nine villages: 
 Jinggu
 Yunpan
 Wenxing
 Wendong
 Tuanshan
 Wenlian
 Wenzhao
 Wenshan
 Xiangshui

History
It was incorporated as a township in 1988. In June 2013 it was upgraded to a town. In August 2013, it was listed among the second batch of "List of Chinese Traditional Villages" by the State Council of China.

Geography
The town is situated at northern Jinggu Dai and Yi Autonomous County. The town is bordered to the north by Zhenyuan Yi, Hani and Lahu Autonomous County, to the east by Fengshan Town, to the south by Weiyuan Town, and to the west by Minle Town.

The Jinggu River flows through the town south to north.

The Jinggu Reservoir is a vast reservoir in the town, which provides drinking water and water for irrigation.

Economy
The economy of the province is strongly based on agriculture, including farming and pig-breeding. The main crops are rice, wheat, corn, potato and vegetable. Commercial crops include tea and tobacco.

Demographics

As of 2004, the National Bureau of Statistics of China estimates the town's population now to be 16,991.

Tourist attractions
The town enjoys rich tourist resources, the popular natural scenic spot is the Jinggu Reservoir. The Tea-horse Ancient Road is a popular attraction.

Dashi Temple is a Taoist temple in the town. It was originally built in 1856, in the Xianfeng era of the late Qing dynasty (1644–1911). New it is a provincial cultural relic preservation organ.

Transportation
The town is crossed by Provincial Highway S222.

References

Bibliography

Divisions of Jinggu Dai and Yi Autonomous County